The Atlantic Coast Conference Fencing Championship is an annual college tournament to determine the team standings for the ACC teams sponsoring fencing (of which there are currently four: Boston College, Duke, North Carolina, and Notre Dame). Individual and team tournaments for both women and men have been held annually since 2015. There was a previous incarnation of the tournament (for men only) which was held between 1971 and 1980. At that point, a number of ACC schools stopped sponsoring fencing, and participation fell below the level necessary to hold a conference championship. The tournament was reinstated (with a women's edition) in 2015, after Notre Dame, which had previously sponsored fencing in a different conference, joined the ACC in most sports.

Men's results

Women's results

References

Championship
Fencing
College fencing conference championships in the United States